Jowett is a surname of early medieval English origin. Notable people with the surname include:

Benjamin Jowett (1817–1893), English scholar and theologian
Edmund Jowett (1858–1936), Australian Country Party politician
Fred Jowett (rugby player) (1879–1939), Welsh rugby player
Frederick William Jowett (1864–1944), British Labour politician who took an anti-war stance
Jim Jowett (1926–1986), English amateur footballer
John Henry Jowett (1864–1923), English Protestant preacher and author
Percy Hague Jowett (1882–1955), British artist and arts administrator
William Jowett (1787–1855), English missionary

See also
 Jewett (disambiguation)
 Jowell (disambiguation)

References

English-language surnames